Donald River may refer to:

Donald River (Hawke's Bay),  a river in the Hawke's Bay region of New Zealand 
Donald River (West Coast),  a short tributary of the Waiatoto River, New Zealand